Syahiran Miswan is a Singaporean former footballer who last played for Geylang International FC as a midfielder. He started his professional career with Home United after graduating from the National Football Academy.

Club career

NFA U17
Syahiran started his career with NFA U17 after graduation in 2015.

Home United
Syahiran moved to the Protectors in 2015 and returned to where he started his youth career. He was part of the team which win the 2016 Singapore Cup semi final against Balestier Khalsa.

Hougang United
Syahiran move to Houang United in 2017. He was released due to a string of poor performances and was picked up by backmarker Geylang International.

Geylang International
Syahiran was sent off in a game against DPMM FC for a foul on Andrey Varankow as his team finished 5th at the end of the 2019 Singapore Premier League season. 

He was contract was not renewed at the end of the season.

Career statistics

References

Singaporean footballers
1994 births
Living people
Singapore Premier League players
Home United FC players
Hougang United FC players
Association football defenders